This is a list of diplomatic missions of Bosnia and Herzegovina, excluding honorary consulates.

Africa

Americas

Asia

Europe

Oceania

International Organizations

Diplomatic missions to be opened

Diplomatic missions to be opened:

Gallery

See also
 Foreign relations of Bosnia and Herzegovina
 List of diplomatic missions in Bosnia and Herzegovina

Notes

References

External links
 Ministry of Foreign Affairs of Bosnia and Herzegovina

 
Bosnia
Diplomatic missions